is a Japanese actor. After being active as a fashion model in Japan, he went to New York at the age of 18. After returning home, he started work as an actor. While he has appeared in numerous television dramas and films, he was also appointed to represent various brands as a model. He also launched his own children's brand "himher" He is represented by the agency Ken-On. His wife is actress Maho Nonami.

Biography
He made his drama debut in Tokyo Dogs in October 2009. After that, he appeared in drama series in eight consecutive seasons.

He later made his film debut in Beck released in 2010.

He married the actress Maho Nonami on 9 December 2012. Their first child, a girl, was born in 2013. Their second daughter was born in 2015.

Filmography

TV dramas

Films

Advertisements

Magazines
He appeared in many publications such as fashion magazines.

References

External links
 
 – Ken-On 

20th-century Japanese male actors
21st-century Japanese male actors
Japanese male models
Ken-On artists
Male actors from Tokyo
1984 births
Living people